In thermodynamics, an exothermic process is a thermodynamic process or reaction that releases energy from the system to its surroundings, usually in the form of heat, but also in a form of light (e.g. a spark, flame, or flash), electricity (e.g. a battery), or sound (e.g. explosion heard when burning hydrogen). The term exothermic was first coined by 19th-century French chemist Marcellin Berthelot.

The opposite of an exothermic process is an endothermic process, one that absorbs energy usually in the form of heat.  The concept is frequently applied in the physical sciences to chemical reactions where chemical bond energy is converted to thermal energy (heat).

Two types of chemical reactions
Exothermic and endothermic describe two types of chemical reactions or systems found in nature, as follows:

Exothermic
After an exothermic reaction, more energy has been released to the surroundings than was absorbed to initiate and maintain the reaction. An example would be the burning of a candle, wherein the sum of calories produced by combustion (found by looking at radiant heating of the surroundings and visible light produced, including the increase in temperature of the fuel (wax) itself, which is converted to hot CO2 and water vapor) exceeds the number of calories absorbed initially in lighting the flame and in the flame maintaining itself (some energy is reabsorbed and used in melting, then vaporizing the wax, etc. but is far outstripped by the energy released when in CO2 and H2O are produced).

Endothermic
In an endothermic reaction or system, energy is taken from the surroundings in the course of the reaction, usually driven by a favorable entropy increase in the system. An example of an endothermic reaction is a first aid cold pack, in which the reaction of two chemicals, or dissolving of one in another, requires calories from the surroundings, and the reaction cools the pouch and surroundings by absorbing heat from them.

Photosynthesis, the process that allows plants to convert carbon dioxide and water to sugar and oxygen, is an endothermic process: plants absorb radiant energy from the sun and use it in an endothermic, otherwise non-spontaneous process. The chemical energy stored can be freed by the inverse (spontaneous) process: combustion of sugar, which gives carbon dioxide, water and heat (radiant energy).

Energy release
Exothermic refers to a transformation in which a closed system releases energy (heat) to the surroundings, expressed by

When the transformation occurs at constant pressure and without exchange of electrical energy, heat  is equal to the enthalpy change, i.e.

while at constant volume, according to the first law of thermodynamics it equals internal energy change, i.e.

In an adiabatic system (i.e. a system that does not exchange heat with the surroundings), an otherwise exothermic process results in an increase in temperature of the system.

In exothermic chemical reactions, the heat that is released by the reaction takes the form of electromagnetic energy or kinetic energy of molecules. The transition of electrons from one quantum energy level to another causes light to be released. This light is equivalent in energy to some of the stabilization energy of the energy for the chemical reaction, i.e. the bond energy. This light that is released can be absorbed by other molecules in solution to give rise to molecular translations and rotations, which gives rise to the classical understanding of heat. In an exothermic reaction, the activation energy (energy needed to start the reaction) is less than the energy that is subsequently released, so there is a net release of energy.

Examples

Some examples of exothermic processes are:
 Combustion of fuels such as wood, coal and oil/petroleum
 The thermite reaction
 The reaction of alkali metals and other highly electropositive metals with water
 Condensation of rain from water vapor
 Mixing water and strong acids or strong bases
 The reaction of acids and bases
 Dehydration of carbohydrates by sulfuric acid
 The setting of cement and concrete
 Some polymerization reactions such as the setting of epoxy resin
 The reaction of most metals with halogens or oxygen
 Nuclear fusion in hydrogen bombs and in stellar cores (to iron) 
 Nuclear fission of heavy elements
 The reaction between zinc and hydrochloric acid
 Respiration (breaking down of glucose to release energy in cells)

Implications for chemical reactions

Chemical exothermic reactions are generally more spontaneous than their counterparts, endothermic reactions.

In a thermochemical reaction that is exothermic, the heat may be listed among the products of the reaction.

See also

 Calorimetry
 Chemical thermodynamics
 Differential scanning calorimetry
 Endergonic
 Endergonic reaction
 Exergonic
 Exergonic reaction
 Endothermic reaction

References

External links

 http://chemistry.about.com/b/a/184556.htm Observe exothermic reactions in a simple experiment

Thermodynamic processes
Chemical thermodynamics

da:Exoterm